Jean-Claude Tramont (May 5, 1930 - December 27, 1996) was a Belgian writer, producer and director best known for his marriage to famous Hollywood agent Sue Mengers and the film All Night Long (1981).

Select Credits
Ash Wednesday (1973) - writer
 (1977) - director, writer
All Night Long (1981) - director
As Summers Die (1986) (TV movie) - director

References

External links

1934 births
1996 deaths
Belgian film directors
Belgian screenwriters
20th-century screenwriters